Si Wilai is subdistrict (tambon) in Si Wilai District, in Bueng Kan Province, northeastern Thailand. It is the seat of Si Wilai District. As of 2010, it had a population of 10,846 people and jurisdiction over 12 villages. It lies on Thailand Route 222, south of Non Sombun and Bueng Kan. A bus service connects it to Bueng Kan.

References

Tambon of Bueng Kan province
Populated places in Bueng Kan province